Brocard can refer to:
 Brocard (law)
 Henri Brocard, a nineteenth-century mathematician, and these geometrical entities he discovered:
 Brocard points
 Brocard triangle
 Brocard circle
 Saint Brocard, first of the priors of the Carmelite Order according to oral tradition